Local elections were held in cities and municipalities across Serbia on 20 December 1992, with a second round of voting taking place on 3 January 1993. The local elections were held concurrently with parliamentary elections in Yugoslavia, presidential and parliamentary elections in Serbia, and elections for the Vojvodina provincial assembly.

The elections were held under a two-round system of voting in single-member constituencies. Taking place during the authoritarian rule of Serbian president Slobodan Milošević, the elections unsurprisingly resulted in a victory for the Socialist Party of Serbia in most jurisdictions, including the capital Belgrade.

This was the second local election cycle to take place while Serbia was a member of the Federal Republic of Yugoslavia, and it occurred against the backdrop of ongoing wars in Croatia and Bosnia and Herzegovina.

Results

City of Belgrade
Results of the election for the City Assembly of Belgrade:

Note: Only parties or alliances that won representation in the assembly are listed.

Results for the City Assembly of Belgrade by municipality:

Incumbent mayor Slobodanka Gruden of the Socialist Party was confirmed for another term in office after the election. She was replaced by Nebojša Čović of the same party on 23 June 1994.

Municipalities of Belgrade

Čukarica
Incumbent mayor Vladimir Matić was confirmed for another term in office after the election.

Grocka
Bogoljub Stevanić of the Socialist Party of Serbia was chosen as mayor after the election. He was replaced by fellow party member Milan Janković in 2005.

New Belgrade
Čedomir Ždrnja of the Socialist Party of Serbia was chosen as mayor after the election.

Palilula
Slavica Tanasković of the Socialist Party of Serbia was chosen as mayor after the election.

Sopot
Incumbent mayor Živorad Milosavljević of the Socialist Party of Serbia was confirmed for another term in office after the election.

Stari Grad
Jovan Kažić of the Serbian Renewal Movement was chosen as mayor after the election.

Voždovac
Božidar Simatković of the Democratic Movement of Serbia was chosen as mayor after the election. He was replaced in 1994 by Zoran Modrinić.

Vračar
Dragan Maršićanin of the Democratic Party of Serbia was chosen as mayor after the election.

Zemun
Nenad Ribar of the Socialist Party of Serbia was chosen as mayor after the election.

Vojvodina

South Bačka District

Novi Sad
Milorad Mirčić of the Serbian Radical Party was chosen as mayor after the election, with the support of the Socialist Party of Serbia. Mirčić was removed from power in June 1994, and an administration dominated by the Socialist Party took office. Milorad Đurđević served as the city's acting mayor until January 1995, when Đuro Bajić was appointed to the position.

Bečej
Results of the election for the Municipal Assembly of Bečej:

Only parties or alliances that won representation in the assembly are listed. Endre Husag of the Democratic Fellowship of Vojvodina Hungarians was chosen as mayor after the election.

Central Serbia (excluding Belgrade)

Nišava District

Niš
The Socialist Party of Serbia won a majority victory in the elections for the City Assembly of Niš, taking fifty-six out of seventy seats. Incumbent mayor Mile Ilić was confirmed for another term in office when the assembly convened.

Doljevac
The Socialist Party of Serbia won the local elections in Doljevac, and Aleksandar Cvetković was chosen as mayor.

Gadžin Han
The Socialist Party of Serbia won the local elections in Gadžin Han, and incumbent mayor Siniša Stamenković was subsequently confirmed for another term in office.

Šumadija District

Kragujevac
Incumbent mayor Živorad Nešić of the Socialist Party of Serbia was confirmed for another term in office after the election.

Topola
Milovan Marinković served as mayor after the election. In 1995, he was replaced by Žarko Jovanović of the Socialist Party.

Kosovo and Metohija

Kosovska Mitrovica District

Zubin Potok
Slaviša Ristić of the Democratic Party of Serbia served as president of Zubin Potok's executive council (i.e., effectively the municipality's prime minister) following the election.

Zvečan
Desimir Petković served as mayor after the election.

References

Elections in Serbia
Local elections in Serbia
1992 elections in Serbia
December 1992 events in Europe
January 1993 events in Europe